Malwida von Meysenbug (28 October 1816 — 23 April 1903) was a German writer, her work including Memories of an Idealist, the first volume of which she published anonymously in 1869. As well, she was a friend of Friedrich Nietzsche and Richard Wagner, and met the French writer Romain Rolland in Rome in 1890.

Von Meysenbug was born at Kassel, Hesse. Her father Carl Rivalier descended from a family of French Huguenots, and received the title of Baron of Meysenbug from William I of Hesse-Kassel. The ninth of ten children, she  broke with her family because of her political convictions. Two of her brothers made brilliant careers, one as a minister of state in Austria, and the other as Minister of the Karlsruhe. von Meysenbug, however, refused to appeal to her family and lived first by joining a free community in Hamburg, and then by immigrating in 1852 to England where she lived by teaching and translating works. There, she met the republicans Ledru-Rollin, Louis Blanc, and Gottfried Kinkel, all political refugees; the young Carl Schurz also became acquainted with her there.

In 1862 von Meysenbug went to Italy with Olga Herzen, the daughter of Alexander Herzen, known as the "father of Russian socialism" (and whose daughters she taught) and resided there. Olga Herzen married Gabriel Monod in 1873 and established herself in France, but Malwida's poor health obstructed her from joining her.

Von Meysenbug introduced Nietzsche to several of his friends, including Helene von Druskowitz. She invited Paul Rée and Nietzsche to Sorrento, a town which overlooks the bay of Naples, in the autumn of 1876. There, Rée wrote The Origins of Moral Sensations, and Nietzsche began Human, All Too Human.

In 1890, the late nineteenth century English novelist George Gissing wrote in his diary that he was 're-reading Memoiren einer Idealisten'.
In 1901 von Meysenbug was the first woman ever to be nominated for the Nobel Prize in Literature after having been nominated by the French historian Gabriel Monod.

Malwida von Meysenbug died in Rome in 1903 and is buried in the Protestant Cemetery in the city.

See also
 Forty-Eighters: She was sympathetic with the 1848 revolutions although not an active participant.

References

 
 Carl Schurz.  New York:  McClure Publ. Co. 1907.  Schurz discusses his friendship with Malwida von Meysenbug in Chapter 14 of Volume One.

External links 

 https://web.archive.org/web/20070610170928/http://sophie.byu.edu/sophiejournal/thesis/Monte_Gardiner_thesis.pdf - translation of Memoirs of an Idealist trans. Monte Gardiner

1816 births
1903 deaths
Writers from Kassel
German baronesses
German expatriates in Italy
German religious humanists
Burials in the Protestant Cemetery, Rome
German women writers
19th-century women writers